Pianeti is the first studio album by Italian singer-songwriter Ultimo, released by Honiro Label on 6 October 2017.
The album was preceded by the singles "Chiave", "Ovunque tu sia" and "Sabbia".

It debuted at number forty-seven on the Italian FIMI Albums Chart; in 2019 it peaked at number five.

Track listing

Charts

Weekly charts

Year-end charts

Certifications

References

2017 albums
Italian-language albums